Kłębanowice   wieś w Polsce położona w województwie dolnośląskim, w powiecie Legnica County Gmina Legnickie Pole, Lower Silesian Voivodeship, in south-western Poland. Prior to 1945 it was in Germany.

References

Villages in Legnica County